Hermann Schmid may refer to
 Hermann von Schmid (1815–1880), Austrian-German novelist
 Hermann Schmid (computer scientist)
 :eo:Hermann Schmid, a German Esperantist